Habiba Marzouk (born May 14, 2002) is an Egyptian individual rhythmic gymnast representing Egypt at international competitions and Wadi Degla SC in national competitions.

Career 
Habiba began gymnastics as a hobby at the age of 3. She joined the Egyptian junior group at the age of 14 to compete in the 2016 African Rhythmic Gymnastics Championship, where she won the all-around silver medal.

In 2018, Habiba competed in the African Rhythmic Gymnastics Championship, where she won 2 gold, 2 silver, and 2 bronze medals in the all-around. In December of the same year, she participated in the Luxembourg Rhythmic Gymnastics Championship and won 2 bronze medals in ribbon and clubs. She also represented Egypt at the 2018 Mediterranean Games in Tarragona, Spain and placed 14th in All Around Qualification with a total score of 47.550.

In December 2019, she participated in Croatia International Rhythmic Gymnastics Championship and won a silver medal in ball and 2 bronze medals in hoop and clubs and finished 4th at the championship as a whole.

On March 12–16, 2020, Habiba competed in the 15th African Rhythmic Gymnastics Championship which held in Sharm El Sheikh and accumulated scores in (hoop:19.75, ball:18.7, clubs:18.1, ribbon:17.15) where she won the all-around gold medal with a total of 73.700 points and qualified to compete in the 2020 Olympic Games in Tokyo.

At the 2020 Olympic Games, Habiba finished twenty-fifth in the qualification round for the individual all-around.

References

External links
 
 

Living people
2002 births
Egyptian rhythmic gymnasts
Sportspeople from Cairo
Olympic gymnasts of Egypt
Gymnasts at the 2020 Summer Olympics